Lumberton is an unincorporated community in Clinton County, Ohio, United States.

History
The first settlement at Lumberton was made in 1820, but the town site was not platted until 1853. A post office called Lumberton was established in 1840, and remained in operation until 1907. The community was named after Lumberton, New Jersey.

Gallery

References

Clinton County, Ohio
1853 establishments in Ohio
Populated places established in 1853